Benjamin "Benny" Kapp (born 9 July 2002) is a German curler.

At the international level, he is a 2022 World Junior Curling Championships and 2019 World Mixed Curling Championship silver medallist.

Teams

Men's

Mixed

Mixed doubles

Personal life
His father is two-time European champion curler and coach Andy Kapp. The two were teammates at the 2019 World Mixed Curling Championship where their team won the silver medal.

References

External links

Video: 

Living people
2002 births
Sportspeople from Füssen
German male curlers
Curlers at the 2020 Winter Youth Olympics
21st-century German people